Lee Bernet (born January 24, 1944) is an American former college and professional American football player. An offensive tackle, he played college football at the University of Wisconsin–Madison and played professionally for the Denver Broncos in the American Football League's 1965 and 1966 seasons. 

Bernet played high school football at Morgan Park High School in Chicago.

See also
List of American Football League players

References

1944 births
Denver Broncos (AFL) players
Wisconsin Badgers football players
Living people
American football tight ends
Players of American football from Chicago